Kzyloba, also known as Kyzyloba, (Qyzyloba; , Kyzyloba) is a town in Atyrau Region, west Kazakhstan.

References

Atyrau Region
Cities and towns in Kazakhstan